In My Songs is the ninth studio album and the first posthumous album by American singer Gerald Levert. It was released posthumously on February 13, 2007, on Atlantic Records. Levert reteamed with longtime collaborator Edwin "Tony" Nicholas to work on the entire album which was completed shortly before his death from an apparent accidental overdose in November 2006. In My Songs debuted and peaked at number two on the US Billboard 200, becoming his highest-charting effort, and won Levert his first Grammy Award in the Best Traditional R&B Performance for the title track at the 50th awards ceremony.

Track listing
Information taken from the album's liner notes.

Notes
  denotes additional producer

Sample credits
 "DJ Don't" contains a replayed sample from "Ain't No Fun (If the Homies Can't Have None)" as performed by Snoop Dogg, cNate Dogg, Warren G, and Kurupt.
 "Hang in There" contains re-sung lyrics from "Cry for You", as performed by Jodeci.
 "M'Lady"contains samples from the recording "Let's Spend Some Time" as performed by Slave.

Personnel
Gerald Levert - lead vocals (tracks 1, 3, 7, 10–11), background vocals (1, 3, 7, 10–11), keyboards (10)
Daris Atkins - additional guitar (track 7)
Ronald Bookman - recording engineer (track 2)
Randy Bowland - guitar (track 8)
Tony Detwiley - guitar (track 1)
Joe Little III - background vocals (track 10)
Glen Marchese - audio mixing (tracks 3, 5, 7, 9)
Manny Marroquin - audio mixing (track 10)
Marq Moody - recording engineer (track 12, assistant on track 2)
Edwin "Tony" Nicholas - keyboards (tracks 1–8, 11–12), drum machine (1-6, 8, 10–12), bass guitar (1-2, 12), guitar (5), string arrangement (7-8)
Russell Thompson - saxophone (track 1)
Pete Tokar - recording engineer (tracks 1, 3–11, overdubs on tracks 2, 12), audio mixing (1-2, 4, 6, 8, 12), organ played by (1)
Dennis Williams - string arrangement (track 8)
Raymond Williams - guitar (tracks 2, 4, 6, 11)
Raymond Wise - string arrangement (track 7)
Sherena Wynn - background vocals (track 1)
Kenny Zahorcak - trumpet (track 1), flugelhorn (1)
Monica Culpepper - Drum Programming (track 1)

Charts

Weekly charts

Year-end charts

References

2007 albums
Gerald Levert albums
Albums published posthumously